Danijel Premuš (born 15 April 1981 in Rijeka) is a former water polo player. Premuš is a Croat who has dual Croatian and Italian citizenship and used to play for Croatia, going as far as being part of the Croatia men's national water polo team at 2004 Summer Olympics in the men's event. At the 2012 Summer Olympics, he competed for the Italy men's national water polo team in the men's event, losing to Croatia in the finals 8-6. He is 6 ft 1 inches tall. After retirement from water polo he returned to School of medicine Rijeka and earned degree in medicine (MD).

See also
 List of Olympic medalists in water polo (men)
 List of sportspeople who competed for more than one nation

References

External links
 
 

1981 births
Living people
Sportspeople from Rijeka
Croatian male water polo players
Italian male water polo players
Water polo centre forwards
Water polo players at the 2004 Summer Olympics
Water polo players at the 2012 Summer Olympics
Medalists at the 2012 Summer Olympics
Olympic water polo players of Croatia
Olympic silver medalists for Italy in water polo
Expatriate water polo players
Italian expatriate sportspeople in Montenegro
Croatian expatriate sportspeople in Montenegro
People with acquired Italian citizenship